A Driver for Vera (Voditel dlya Very) is a 2004 Ukrainian-Russian co-produced psychological drama film from 2004, set in 1962 Sevastopol, Ukraine, directed and written by Russian Pavel Chukhrai. The film won numerous Russian awards including Best Film at the Sochi Film Festival. The film's two-country origin resulted in the film being rejected as Ukraine's entry for the Academy Awards Best Foreign Film category for 2005, due to a rule which states, "[T]he submitting country must certify that creative talent of that country exercised artistic control of the film."

Plot
During the Khrushchev Thaw in Soviet Crimea, Ukraine, a young cadet in the Red Army named Viktor (Igor Petrenko), becomes a chauffeur for a general (Bohdan Stupka). Viktor begins a relationship with the general's disabled and volatile daughter, Vera (Alyona Babenko). Viktor becomes involuntarily involved in a plot by the KGB whereby KGB agent Saveliev (Andrei Panin) pushes Viktor to spy on the general for KGB purposes. As the action develops around Viktor's relationship with Vera and his conflicted reasons for pursuing it, contrasted with the raw sexual tension between Viktor and the maid, Lida (Yekaterina Yudina), and her scathing attack on his motives rel Vera, the KGB, using Agent Saveliev, plots to take down and ultimately kill the general. Nobody is safe.

Reception
From Rotten Tomatoes, the film has earned a "liked it" rating of 79 percent based on 155 user ratings. 
After acknowledging the film's numerous Russian awards, movie critic Ronnie Scheib nevertheless panned the film in entertainment magazine Variety opining, for example, "[The] pic[ture]'s oddly disjointed wedding of operatic emotionalism and cool aesthetic distance may prove more off-putting than enthralling."

See also

 Cinema of Ukraine
 List of submissions to the 77th Academy Awards for Best Foreign Language Film

References

External links
 

2004 films
Ukrainian drama films
Russian drama films
Films scored by Eduard Artemyev
Films set in 1962
Films set in Crimea
Films set in Moscow
Films set in the Soviet Union
Films shot in Crimea
Films shot in Moscow
Russian-language Ukrainian films
2000s psychological drama films
2004 drama films